History of Education Quarterly is a quarterly peer-reviewed academic journal covering the history of education. It is published by Cambridge University Press on behalf of the History of Education Society and was established in 1949 as the History of Education Journal, obtaining its current name in 1961. At the time, Ryland W. Crary (University of Pittsburgh) became the editor-in-chief. He was succeeded by Henry J. Perkinson (New York University, 1969-1972); Paul H. Mattingly (New York University, 1972-1986) and James McLachlan (New York University, co-editor 1984-1986); Edward McClellan (Indiana University, 1986–1988, 1996-1998); William J. Reese (Indiana University, 1988-1996); Richard J. Altenbaugh (Slippery Rock University, 1998-2007); James D. Anderson (University of Illinois Urbana-Champaign, 2007-2015), Yoon Pak (University of Illinois Urbana-Champaign, co-editor 2007-2015), and Christopher Span (University of Illinois Urbana-Champaign, co-editor 2007-2015); Nancy Beadie (University of Washington, 2015-2020) and Joy Williamson-Lott (University of Washington, 2015-2020). The current co-editors are AJ Angulo and Jack Schneider, and Christopher Carlsmith serves as associate editor. All three are based at the University of Massachusetts Lowell.

Abstracting and indexing
The journal is abstracted and indexed in the following bibliographic databases:

References

Further reading

External links

English-language journals
Publications established in 1949
Quarterly journals
Education history journals
Cambridge University Press academic journals